Féthi Baccouche (born 16 November 1960) is a retired Tunisian long-distance runner who specialized in the 3000 metres steeplechase, the 5000 metres and the 10,000 metres.

He was born in Tunis, and represented the club ASM Tunis. One of his first international achievements was a gold medal at the 1976 ISF World Gymnasiade.

He finished twelfth in the steeplechase at the 1984 Olympic Games, and also competed in the 5000 metres at the same Olympics. He also competed at the 1983 World Championships, the 1987 World Championships and the 1988 Olympic Games without reaching the final. His best result at the World Cross Country Championships was a 38th place from 1985.

At the 1987 Mediterranean Games he won the bronze medal in the steeplechase and the gold in the 10,000 metres. He won gold medals in both these events at the 1985 Pan Arab Games. At the 1985 African Championships he won a steeplechase bronze medal, and at the 1983 Summer Universiade he won the 5000 metres silver medal and the 10,000 metres bronze medal.

His personal best times were 7.46.17 minutes in the 3000 metres, achieved in July 1986 in Paris; 8.15.07 minutes in the 3000 metres steeplechase, achieved in July 1987 in Helsinki; and 13.13.94 minutes in the 5000 metres, achieved in July 1987 at Bislett stadion in Oslo. In middle distance events he had 3.37.98 minutes in the 1500 metres, achieved in July 1987 in Nice; and 3.57.90 minutes in the mile run, achieved in June 1987 in Verona.

References

1960 births
Living people
Tunisian male long-distance runners
Tunisian male steeplechase runners
Athletes (track and field) at the 1984 Summer Olympics
Athletes (track and field) at the 1988 Summer Olympics
Olympic athletes of Tunisia
Sportspeople from Tunis
Universiade medalists in athletics (track and field)
Mediterranean Games gold medalists for Tunisia
Mediterranean Games bronze medalists for Tunisia
Mediterranean Games medalists in athletics
Athletes (track and field) at the 1987 Mediterranean Games
Universiade medalists for Tunisia
Medalists at the 1983 Summer Universiade
21st-century Tunisian people